Humerana is a genus of frogs in the family Ranidae from southern and southeastern Asia. It was originally proposed as a subgenus of Rana. It may belong to Hylarana.

Humerana contains the following species:
 Humerana humeralis (Boulenger, 1887)
 Humerana lateralis (Boulenger, 1887)
 Humerana miopus (Boulenger, 1918)
 Humerana oatesii (Boulenger, 1892)

References

 
True frogs
Amphibians of Asia
Amphibian genera